Kardigap is a tehsil of Mastung District (Balochistan). It is located in the northwest of Balochistan  province, Pakistan.

Populated places in Mastung District